Harold Oliver Gulliksen (July 18, 1903 – October 27, 1996) was an American psychologist. A professor at Princeton University for most of his academic career, Gulliksen pioneered in the field of psychometrics. In 1952 he was elected as a Fellow of the American Statistical Association.

References 

1903 births
1996 deaths
20th-century American psychologists
University of Washington alumni
University of Chicago alumni
Princeton University faculty
Fellows of the American Statistical Association